Jota may refer to:

 Iota (Ι, ι), the name of the 9th letter in the Greek alphabet;
 (figuratively) Something very small, based on the fact that the letter Iota (lat. i) is the smallest character in the alphabet;
 The name of the letter J in Spanish and Portuguese;
 Jota (music), a type of Spanish music and dance;
 Jota (food), an Istrian bean-sauerkraut stew;
 Laverda Jota, an Italian motorcycle;
 Jota Sport, an English car racing team;
 Jamboree on the Air (JOTA), an international amateur radio event in the Boy Scouts;
 Lamborghini Diablo SE30 Jota, a circuit racing version of the Lamborghini Diablo 30th anniversary edition;
 Lamborghini Miura P400 Jota, a model of the Lamborghini Miura;
 Mazda Jota MX-5 GT, a model of the Mazda MX-5;
 Jota Aviation, a British airline.

People

Footballers
 Jota (Spanish footballer) (José Ignacio Peleteiro Ramallo), born 1991
 Jota (footballer, born 1993) (João Tiago Serrão Garcês), Portuguese footballer
 Jota (footballer, born 1999) (João Pedro Neves Filipe), Portuguese footballer
 Diogo Jota (born 1996), Portuguese footballer
 Diego Jota Martins, Brazilian footballer

Other people
 Jota (singer), born Lee Jonghwa, member of K-pop band MADTOWN
 Jota Mario Valencia (1956–2019), Colombian TV presenter
 Jota Carajota, Spanish drag queen

See also
 Iota (disambiguation)
 Yota (disambiguation)
 Jot (disambiguation)